4 Song CD is an EP by Sebadoh, released in 1994.

Track listing
"Mor Backlash"
"Rebound"
"Not a Friend"
"Careful"
"Foreground"
"Naima"
"40203"
"Mystery Man"
"Drumstick Jumble"
"Lime Kiln"

References

1994 EPs
Sebadoh EPs
Domino Recording Company EPs